Alan Brown (born 23 December 1957) is a former English cricketer who played one first-class and one List A match for Worcestershire as a wicketkeeper in 1979. He was born in Darwen, Lancashire.

His first-team career lasted four days: his only first-class match was a three-day affair against Oxford University, and on the Sunday that fell between the first and second days of that game he appeared in a John Player League match against Middlesex after standing in for David Humphries who was injured three quarters of an hour beforehand. Worcestershire declared twice against the students and were not bowled out against Middlesex, so Brown did not get a bat. He did, however, hold five catches over the two games.

Brown played for several years (1976–1979) at Second XI level, making two half-centuries in 49 innings. He also played one minor game against Ireland in 1979.

References

External links
 
 Statistical summary from CricketArchive

1957 births
Living people
English cricketers
Worcestershire cricketers
People from Darwen
Wicket-keepers